

Events

January

 January 1 – Edward VII is proclaimed Emperor of India.
 January 19 – The first west–east transatlantic radio broadcast is made from the United States to England (the first east–west broadcast having been made in 1901).

February

 February 13 – Venezuelan crisis: After agreeing to arbitration in Washington, the United Kingdom, Germany and Italy reach a settlement with Venezuela resulting in the Washington Protocols. The naval blockade that began in 1902 will end. 
 February 23 – Cuba leases Guantánamo Bay to the United States "in perpetuity".

March

 March 2 – In New York City, the Martha Washington Hotel, the first hotel exclusively for women, opens.
 March 3 – The British Admiralty announces plans to build a naval base at Rosyth.
 March 5 – The Ottoman Empire and the German Empire sign an agreement to build the Constantinople–Baghdad Railway.
 March 12 – The University of Puerto Rico is founded.
 March 13 – Having abolished the Sokoto Caliphate in West Africa, the new British administration accepts the concession of its last vizier.
 March 14 – The Hay–Herrán Treaty, granting the United States the right to build the Panama Canal, is ratified by the United States Senate. The Colombian senate later rejects the treaty.

April

April 19–21 (April 6–8 O.S.) – The first Kishinev pogrom, beginning on Easter Day, takes place in Kishinev, capital of the Bessarabia Governorate of the Russian Empire. At least 47 Jews are killed and others injured during mob rioting encouraged by blood libel articles in the press and led by priests; no attempt is made by police or military to intervene until the third day. 
 April 26 – Atlético Madrid is officially founded as a professional association football club in Spain.
 April 29
The 30-million-m3 Frank Slide rockslide kills 70–90 in Frank, Alberta.
The 7.0  Manzikert earthquake affects eastern Turkey, leaving 3,500 dead (local time; April 28 23:46 UTC).

May

 May 4 – Leading Macedonian revolutionary Gotse Delchev is killed in a skirmish with the Turkish army.
 May 18 – The port of Burgas, Bulgaria opens.
 May 24 – The Paris–Madrid race for automobiles begins, during which at least eight people are killed; the French government stops the event at Bordeaux and impounds all of the competitors' cars.
 May 26 – Românul de la Pind, the longest-running newspaper by and about Aromanians until World War II, is founded.

June

 June 11 (May 29 O.S.) – King Alexander Obrenović and Queen Draga of Serbia are assassinated in Belgrade by the Black Hand (Crna Ruka) organization.
 June 14 – The town of Heppner, Oregon is nearly destroyed by a cloud burst that results in a flash flood that kills about 238 people.
 June 16 – The Ford Motor Company is founded by Henry Ford with $28,000 in cash from 12 investors. 
 June 27 – American socialite Aida de Acosta, 19, becomes the first woman to fly a powered aircraft solo when she pilots Santos-Dumont's motorized dirigible, "No. 9", from Paris to Château de Bagatelle in France.

July

 July 1–19 – The first Tour de France bicycle race is held; Maurice Garin wins it.
 July 7 – The British take over the Fulani Empire.
 July 29 – The explosion of a United States Cartridge Company magazine destroys 70 homes, killing 22 residents of Tewksbury, Massachusetts.
 July 30–August 23 (July 17–August 10, O.S.) – The Second Congress of the All-Russian Social Democratic Labour Party is held in exile in Brussels, transferring to London.

August

 August 2 – The Ilinden–Preobrazhenie Uprising, organized by the Secret Macedonian-Adrianople Revolutionary Organization, breaks out in the Ottoman provinces of Macedonia and Adrianople. 
 August 3 – The Kruševo Republic is proclaimed in Ottoman Macedonia; it is crushed 10 days later.
 August 4 – Pope Pius X succeeds Pope Leo XIII as the 257th pope.
 August 10 – The Paris Métro train fire at Couronnes results in 84 deaths.
 August 25 – The Judiciary Act is passed in the Australian parliament.

September

 September – Texas State University in San Marcos, Texas opens as Southwest Texas Normal School.
 September 11 – The first stock-car event is held at the Milwaukee Mile.
 September 14 – Joseph Chamberlain resigns as British Colonial Secretary in order to campaign publicly for Imperial Preference.
 September 15 – Grêmio Foot-Ball Porto Alegrense is founded in Porto Alegre, Brazil.
 September 24 – Edmund Barton steps down as Prime Minister of Australia and is succeeded by Alfred Deakin.
 September 27 – The Wreck of the Old 97 Fast Mail train at Stillhouse Trestle, near Danville, Virginia, kills 11 people and inspires a ballad.
 September 29 – Prussia becomes the second jurisdiction to require mandatory driver's licenses for operators of motor vehicles, after New York State in 1901.

October

 October 1-13 – First modern World Series: The Boston Americans defeat the Pittsburgh Pirates in eight games.
 October 6 – The High Court of Australia sits for the first time.
 October 10 – The Women's Social and Political Union is founded in the U.K.

November

 November 2 – Maggie L. Walker becomes the first African American woman to charter a bank.
 November 3 – Separation of Panama from Colombia: With the encouragement of the United States, Panama proclaims itself independent of Colombia.
 November 6 – The English-language South China Morning Post newspaper is first published in Hong Kong.
 November 13 – The United States recognizes the independence of Panama.
 November 17 – The Russian Social Democratic Labour Party splits into two groups: the Bolsheviks (Russian for "majority") and Mensheviks (Russian for "minority").
 November 18 – The Hay–Bunau-Varilla Treaty is signed by the United States and Panama, giving the U.S. exclusive rights over the Panama Canal Zone.
 November 23 – Colorado governor James Hamilton Peabody sends the state militia into the town of Cripple Creek to break up a miners' strike.
 November 28 –  is wrecked on a reef outside Melbourne, Australia, causing one of the world's first major oil spills.

December

 December 16 – The Taj Mahal Palace Hotel in Bombay (now Mumbai), India opens.
 December 17 – Orville Wright flies an aircraft with a petrol engine, the Wright Flyer, at Kitty Hawk, North Carolina in the first documented and successful powered and controlled heavier-than-air flight.
 December 30 – The Iroquois Theatre fire in Chicago kills 600.
 December 31 – The National Association for Women's Suffrage (Sweden) is founded.

Date unknown
 The Lincoln–Lee Legion is established to promote the American temperance movement and the signing of alcohol-abstinence pledges by children.
 The first box of Crayola crayons is made and sold for five cents. It contains eight colors; brown, red, orange, yellow, green, blue, violet and black.
 Osea Island off Maldon, Essex, England is bought by Frederick Nicholas Charrington to provide an addiction treatment centre.
 The Czech women's organisation Ženský Klub Český is founded.
 American motorbike brand Harley-Davidson is founded in Wisconsin.
 Compression Rheostat, the predecessor of industrial automation and industrial equipment parts brand Rockwell Automation, is founded in Wisconsin, United States.

Births

January

 January 1 – Jasimuddin, Bangladeshi poet, lyricist, composer and writer (d. 1976)
 January 2 - Kane Tanaka, Japanese supercentenarian, oldest Japanese person ever, last surviving person born in 1903 (d. 2022)
 January 6 – Maurice Abravanel, Greek-born conductor (d. 1993)
 January 10 – Barbara Hepworth, English sculptor (d. 1975)
 January 11 – Alan Paton, South African author, anti-apartheid activist (d. 1988)
 January 12
Igor Kurchatov, Soviet and Russian physicist (d. 1960)
Andrew J. Transue, American politician and attorney (Morissette v. United States) (d. 1995)
 January 16
Peter Brocco, American actor (d. 1992)
William Grover-Williams, French race car driver, war hero (d. 1945)
 January 17 – Warren Hull, American actor (d. 1974)
 January 18 – Gladys Hooper, British supercentenarian (d. 2016)
 January 22 – Fritz Houtermans, Polish physicist (d. 1966)
 January 23 – Jorge Eliécer Gaitán, Colombian politician (d. 1948)
 January 27 – John Eccles, Australian neuropsychologist, recipient of the Nobel Prize in Physiology or Medicine (d. 1997)

February

 February 2 – Bartel Leendert van der Waerden, Dutch mathematician (d. 1996)
 February 3 – Douglas Douglas-Hamilton, 14th Duke of Hamilton, Scottish nobleman, aviation pioneer (d. 1973)
 February 4 – Alexander Imich, American parapsychologist, chemist (d. 2014)
 February 6 – Claudio Arrau, Chilean-born pianist (d. 1991)
 February 8
 Greta Keller, Vienna-born cabaret singer, actress (d. 1977)
 Tunku Abdul Rahman, first Prime Minister of Malaysia (d. 1990)
 February 10 
 Waldemar Hoven, German physician (d. 1948)
 Matthias Sindelar, Austrian footballer (d. 1939)
 February 11 
 Rex Lease, American actor (d. 1966)
 Hans Redlich, Austrian composer (d. 1968)
 February 12 
 Jorge Basadre, Peruvian historian (d. 1980)
 Lincoln Maazel, American singer and actor (d. 2009) 
 February 13 – Georges Simenon, French writer (d. 1989)
 February 14 – Stuart Erwin, American actor (d. 1967)
 February 16 – Edgar Bergen, American ventriloquist (d. 1978)
 February 21
 Anaïs Nin, French writer (d. 1977)
 Raymond Queneau, French poet, novelist (d. 1976)
 February 22
 Morley Callaghan, Canadian writer, media personality (d. 1990)
 Ain-Ervin Mere, Estonian Nazi (d. 1969)
 Frank P. Ramsey, English mathematician (d. 1930)
 February 24 – Vladimir Bartol, Slovenian author (d. 1967)
 February 26 – Giulio Natta, Italian chemist, Nobel Prize laureate (d. 1979)
 February 27 – Grethe Weiser, German actress (d. 1970)
 February 28 – Vincente Minnelli, American director (d. 1986)

March

 March 4
 William C. Boyd, American immunochemist (d. 1983)
 Dorothy Mackaill, British-born American actress (d. 1990)
 John Scarne, American magician, card expert (d. 1985)
 March 6 – Empress Kōjun, empress consort of Japan (d. 2000)
 March 10
 Bix Beiderbecke, American jazz musician (d. 1931)
 Clare Boothe Luce, American publisher, writer (d. 1987)
 March 11
 Ronald Syme, New Zealand-born classicist, historian (d. 1989)
 Lawrence Welk, American television musician, bandleader (d. 1992)
 March 14 – Mustafa Barzani, Kurdish politician (d. 1979)
 March 18 – Gian Galeazzo Ciano, 2nd Count of Cortellazzo and Buccari, Italian aristocrat and diplomat (d. 1944)
 March 19 – W.R. Supratman, Indonesian violinist (d. 1938)
 March 20 
 Edgar Buchanan, American actor (d. 1979)
 Maria Giuseppa Robucci, Italian supercentenarian (d. 2019)
 March 21 – Frank Sargeson, New Zealand writer (d. 1982)
March 23 – Germán Busch, 36th President of Bolivia (d. 1939)
 March 24 
 Adolf Butenandt, German chemist, Nobel Prize laureate (d. 1995)
 Malcolm Muggeridge, English journalist (d. 1990)
 March 25 – Nahum Norbert Glatzer, Jewish-American scholar (d. 1990)
 March 27 – Betty Balfour, English screen actress (d. 1977)
 March 28 – Rudolf Serkin, Austrian pianist (d. 1991)
 March 31 – H. J. Blackham, British humanist, author (d. 2009)

April

 April 3 – Lola Alvarez Bravo, Mexican photographer (d. 1993)
 April 5 – Hilda Bruce, British zoologist (d. 1974)
 April 6
 Mickey Cochrane, American baseball player (d. 1962)
 Doc Edgerton, American electrical engineer (d. 1990)
 April 9 – Gregory Goodwin Pincus, American biologist, researcher (d. 1967)
 April 12 – Jan Tinbergen, Dutch economist, Nobel Prize laureate (d. 1994)
 April 15 – John Williams, English-born actor (d. 1983)
 April 17
 Gregor Piatigorsky, American cellist (d. 1976)
 Morgan Taylor, American athlete (d. 1975)
 April 19 – Eliot Ness, American Prohibition agent (d. 1957)
 April 24 – José Antonio Primo de Rivera, Spanish politician (d. 1936)
 April 25 – Andrey Kolmogorov, Soviet and Russian mathematician (d. 1987)

May

 May 2 – Benjamin Spock, American pediatrician (d. 1998)
 May 3 – Bing Crosby, American singer, actor (d. 1977)
 May 4 
 Luther Adler, American actor (d. 1984)
 Paul Demel, Czech actor (d. 1951)
 May 6 – Toots Shor, New York restaurateur (d. 1977)
 May 8 – Fernandel, French actor (d. 1971)
 May 10 – Hans Jonas, German-born philosopher (d. 1993)
 May 11 – Charlie Gehringer, American baseball player (d. 1993)
 May 12 – Faith Bennett, British actress, WWII ATA pilot (d. 1969)
 May 14 – Billie Dove, American actress (d. 1997)
 May 18 – Frits Warmolt Went, Dutch botanist (d. 1990) 
 May 19 – Shimoe Akiyama, Japanese supercentenarian (d. 2019)
 May 23 – Shelah Richards, Irish actress, director, and producer (d. 1985)
 May 24 – Lofton R. Henderson, American naval aviator (killed in the Battle of Midway) (d. 1942)
 May 25 – Binnie Barnes, English actress (d. 1998)
 May 29 – Bob Hope, English-born American comedian, actor (d. 2003)

June

 June 1
 Niní Marshall, Argentine humorist, comic actress and screenwriter (d. 1996) 
 Vasyl Velychkovsky, Ukrainian bishop (d. 1973)
 June 6 
Aram Khachaturian, Soviet and Armenian composer (d. 1978)
 Bakht Singh, Indian evangelist, well-known Bible teacher, preacher (d. 2000)
 June 8 – Marguerite Yourcenar, Belgian-French author (d. 1987)
 June 10 – Theo Lingen, German actor (d. 1978)
 June 12 – Emmett Hardy, American musician (d. 1925)
 June 15 – Huldreich Georg Früh, Swiss composer (d. 1945)
 June 18
 Jeanette MacDonald, American singer, actress (d. 1965)
 Raymond Radiguet, French author (d. 1923)
 June 19
 Lou Gehrig, American baseball player (d. 1941)
 Wally Hammond, English cricketer (d. 1965)
 June 20 – Eddie Laughton, British-born American film actor (d. 1952)
 June 21
 Al Hirschfeld, American caricaturist (d. 2003)
 Lucy Sutherland, Australian-born British historian, academic and public servant (d. 1980)
 June 22
 John Dillinger, American bank robber (d. 1934)
 Jiro Horikoshi, Japanese aircraft designer (d. 1982)
 Carl Hubbell, American baseball player (d. 1988)
 Ben Pollack, American jazz drummer, bandleader (d. 1971)
 Ben Robertson, American novelist, journalist, and war correspondent (d. 1943)
 June 23 
 Louis Seigner, French actor (d. 1991)
 Frances Dewey Wormser, American stage actress, entertainer and vaudeville performer (d. 2008)
 Paul Martin Sr., Canadian politician (d. 1992)
 June 25
 Pierre Brossolette, French journalist, resistance fighter (d. 1944)
 George Orwell, English author (d. 1950)
 Anne Revere, American actress (d. 1990)
 June 26
 Harry DeWolf, Canadian naval officer (d. 2000)
 Big Bill Broonzy, American blues singer, composer (d. 1958) (some sources give his year of birth as 1893)
 June 29
 Max Winter, American businessman, sport executive (d. 1996)
 Alan Blumlein, British electronics engineer (d. 1942)

July

 July 1
 Don Beddoe, American character actor (d. 1991) 
 Amy Johnson, English aviator (d. 1941)
 July 2
 Harwell Hamilton Harris, American architect (d. 1990)
 Charles Poletti, American lawyer and politician (d. 2002)
 Alec Douglas-Home, Prime Minister of the United Kingdom (d. 1995)
 King Olav V of Norway (d. 1991)
 July 3 – Ace Bailey, Canadian hockey player (d. 1992)
 July 4 
 Corrado Bafile, Italian Catholic cardinal (d. 2005)
 Walter Trohan, American journalist (d. 2003)
 Howard Hobson, American basketball player and coach of football, basketball, and baseball (d. 1991)
 July 5 
 Edward Woods, American actor (d. 1989)
 Willem Peters, Dutch athlete (d. 1995)
 July 6 – Hugo Theorell, Swedish scientist, recipient of the Nobel Prize in Physiology or Medicine (d. 1982)
 July 7 
Gustaf Jonsson, Swedish cross country skier (d. 1990)
 Steven Runciman, English historian (d. 2000)
 July 10 – Werner Best, German SS officer, jurist (d. 1989)
 July 12 – Judith Hare, Countess of Listowel, Hungarian-born journalist, writer (d. 2003)
 July 13 
 Olle Hallberg, Swedish long jumper (d. 1996)
 Kenneth Clark, English art historian (d. 1983)
 July 14 
 Thomas D. Clark, American historian (d. 2005)
 Henricus Cockuyt, Belgian sprinter (d. 1993)
 July 16 – Mary Philbin, American notable film actress of the silent film era (d. 1993)
 July 18 – Victor Gruen, Austrian-Jewish architect and inventor of the shopping mall (d. 1980)
 July 21 – Roy Neuberger, American financier, art collector (d. 2010)
 July 26 – Estes Kefauver, American politician (d. 1963)
 July 27 – Michail Stasinopoulos, 1st president of Greece (d. 2002)

August

 August 3
 Habib Bourguiba, 1st President of Tunisia (d. 2000)
 Fahri Korutürk, 6th President of Turkey (d. 1987)
 August 5 – Prince Nicholas of Romania (d. 1978)
 August 6 – Virginia Foster Durr, American civil rights activist (d. 1999)
 August 7
 Rudolf Ising, American cartoon animator (d. 1992)
 Louis Leakey, British archaeologist (d. 1972)
 August 13 – Chubby Johnson, American actor (d. 1974)
 August 14 – Lodewijk Bruckman, Dutch painter (d. 1995)
 August 19 – James Gould Cozzens, American writer (d. 1978)
 August 24 – Graham Sutherland, English artist (d. 1980)
 August 26 – Ian Dalrymple, British screenwriter, film director and producer (d. 1989)
 August 31
 Arthur Godfrey, American radio, television host (d. 1983)
 Hugh Harman, American cartoon animator (d. 1982)

September

 September 2 – Fred Pratt Green, British Methodist minister, hymn writer (d. 2000)
 September 7
 Dorothy Marie Donnelly, American poet (d. 1994)
 Shimaki Kensaku, Japanese author (d. 1945)
 John Kloza, Polish professional baseball player, manager (d. 1962)
 September 8 – Jane Arbor, British writer (d. 1994)
 September 9
 Lev Shankovsky, Ukrainian military historian (d. 1995)
 Edward Upward, English author (d. 2009)
 Phyllis Whitney, American mystery writer (d. 2008)
 September 10 – Cyril Connolly, English critic, writer (d. 1974)
 September 11 – Theodor W. Adorno, German philosopher (d. 1969)
 September 13 – Claudette Colbert, American actress (d. 1996)
 September 15
 Roy Acuff, American country musician (d. 1992)
 Yisrael Kristal, Polish-born Israeli supercentenarian, Holocaust survivor, and former world's oldest living man (d. 2017)
 September 17 – Karel Miljon, Dutch boxer (d. 1984)
 September 21 – Preston Tucker, American automobile designer (d. 1956)
 September 25
 Abul A'la Maududi, Pakistani journalist, theologian, and philosopher (d. 1979)
 Mark Rothko, Latvian-born painter (d. 1970)
 September 27 – Leonard Barr, American stand-up comic, actor, and dancer (d. 1980)
 September 28 – Tateo Katō, Japanese fighter ace (d. 1942)
 September 29 – Miguel Alemán Valdés, Mexican lawyer and civilian president (1946-1952) (d. 1983)
 September 29 – Ted de Corsia, American actor (d.1973)
 September 30 – Lyle Goodhue, American chemist, inventor and entomologist (d. 1981)

October

 October 1 – Vladimir Horowitz, American pianist (d. 1989)
 October 4 – John Vincent Atanasoff, American computer engineer (d. 1995)
 October 5 – M. King Hubbert, American geophysicist (d. 1989)
 October 6 – Ernest Walton, Irish physicist, Nobel Prize laureate (d. 1995)
 October 8 – Ferenc Nagy, 40th prime minister of Hungary (d. 1979)
 October 9 – Walter O'Malley, American baseball executive (d. 1979)
 October 10
 Prince Charles, Count of Flanders (d. 1983)
 Bei Shizhang, Chinese biologist, educator (d. 2009)
 October 11 – Kazimierz Kordylewski, Polish astronomer (d. 1981)
 October 16 
 Rex Bell, American actor and politician (d. 1962)
 Cecile de Brunhoff, French storyteller (d. 2003)
 October 18 – Lina Radke, German athlete (d. 1983)
 October 20 – John Davis Lodge, American actor and politician (d. 1985)
 October 22
 George Beadle, American geneticist, recipient of the Nobel Prize in Physiology or Medicine (d. 1989)
 Zlatyu Boyadzhiev, Bulgarian painter (d. 1976)
 Jerome "Curly Howard" Horwitz, American comedian, actor (The Three Stooges) (d. 1952)
 October 23 
 Thaddeus B. Hurd, American architect, historian (d. 1989)
 Maurice Tillet, French professional wrestler (d. 1954)
 October 24 - Melvin Purvis, American lawman and FBI agent (d. 1960)
October 25
 Katharine Byron, American politician (d. 1976)
 Harry Shoulberg, American painter (d. 1995)
 October 26 – Bill Allington, American baseball player, manager (d. 1966)
 October 28 – Evelyn Waugh, English novelist (d. 1966)
 October 29 – Vivian Ellis, English composer, lyricist (d. 1996)
 October 31 – Joan Robinson, English economist (d. 1983)

November

 November 1 – Max Adrian, Northern Irish actor (d. 1973)
 November 2 – Edgard Potier, Belgian spy (d. 1944)
 November 3 
 Walker Evans, American photographer (d. 1975)
 Charles Rigoulot, French weightlifter (d. 1962)
 November 4 
Robert Emerson, American scientist (d. 1959)
Watchman Nee, Chinese Christian preacher, church leader (d. 1972)
 November 6 – Carl Rakosi, German-born poet (d. 2004)
 November 7
Dean Jagger, American actor (d. 1991)
Konrad Lorenz, Austrian zoologist, recipient of the Nobel Prize in Physiology or Medicine (d. 1989)
 November 8 – Alfred Thambiayah, Ceylon Tamil businessman, politician (d.?)
 November 11 – Blessed Victoria Díez Bustos de Molina, Spanish teacher, religious woman (d. 1936)
 November 12 – Jack Oakie, American actor (d. 1978)
 November 19 – Nancy Carroll, American actress (d. 1965)
 November 25 – DeHart Hubbard, American Olympic athlete (d. 1976)
 November 26 – Alice Herz-Sommer, Czech-British supercentenarian and pianist and teacher (d. 2014)
 November 27
Jamil Hashweh, Palestinian translator (d. 1982)
Lars Onsager, Norwegian chemist, Nobel Prize laureate (d. 1976)
 November 29 – E. Harold Munn, American temperance movement leader, presidential candidate (d. 1992)

December

 December 4
 Lazar Lagin, Soviet and Russian writer (d. 1979)
 A. L. Rowse, English historian (d. 1997)
 December 5
 Johannes Heesters, Dutch singer, actor (d. 2011)
 Cecil Frank Powell, British physicist, Nobel Prize laureate (d. 1969)
 December 10 – Una Merkel, American actress (d. 1986)
 December 12
 Dagmar Nordstrom, American composer, pianist (d. 1976)
 Yasujirō Ozu, Japanese film director (d. 1963)
 December 13 – Ella Baker, American civil rights activist (d. 1986)
 December 16 – Harold Whitlock, British Olympic athlete (d. 1985)
 December 17 – Erskine Caldwell, American author (d. 1987)
 December 19 – George Davis Snell, American geneticist, recipient of the Nobel Prize in Physiology or Medicine (d. 1996)
 December 22 – Haldan Keffer Hartline, American physiologist, Nobel Prize laureate (d. 1983)
 December 24 – Joseph Cornell, American sculptor (d. 1972)
 December 26 – Elisha Cook Jr., American actor (d. 1995)
 December 28
 Earl Hines, American jazz pianist (d. 1983)
 John von Neumann, Hungarian-born mathematician (d. 1957)
 December 29 – Clyde McCoy, American jazz trumpeter (d. 1990)
 December 31 – Nathan Milstein, Ukrainian violinist (d. 1992)

Deaths

January–June

 January 3 – Alois Hitler, Austrian civil servant, father of Adolf Hitler (b. 1837)
 January 4 – Alexander Aksakov, Russian writer (b. 1832)
 January 5 – Práxedes Mateo Sagasta, Spanish politician, eight-time prime minister (b. 1825)
 January 17 – Quintin Hogg, British philanthropist (b. 1845)
 January 24 – Petko Karavelov, 4th Prime Minister of Bulgaria (b. 1843)
 January 28
 Augusta Holmès, French composer (b. 1847)
 Robert Planquette, French composer (b. 1850)
 February 1 – Sir George Gabriel Stokes, Irish mathematician, physicist (b. 1819)
 February 4 – Zhang Peilun, Chinese naval commander and government official (b. 1848)
 February 7 – James Glaisher, English meteorologist, aeronaut (b. 1809)
 February 9 – Sir Charles Duffy, Irish-born Australian politician, 8th Premier of Victoria (b. 1816)
 February 14 – Archduchess Elisabeth Franziska of Austria (b. 1831)
 February 17 – Joseph Parry, Welsh composer (b. 1841)
 February 22 – Hugo Wolf, Austrian composer (b. 1860)
 February 26 – Richard Jordan Gatling, American inventor (b. 1818)
 March 2 – Rafael Zaldívar, former President of El Salvador (b. 1834)
March 3 - Robert Sanford Foster, Union Army general (b. 1834)
 March 4 – Joseph Henry Shorthouse, English novelist (b. 1834)
 March 5 – Gaston Paris, French scholar (b. 1839)
 March 7 – István Bittó, 7th prime minister of Hungary (b. 1822)
 March 11 – Lou Graham (Seattle madame), American brothel owner (b. 1857)
 March 13 – George Granville Bradley, English vicar, scholar (b. 1821)
 March 16 – Roy Bean, American justice of the peace (b. 1825)
 March 25 – Sir Hector MacDonald, British army general (b. 1853)
 March 28 – Émile Baudot, French telegraph engineer (b. 1845)
 April 4 – Margaret Ann Neve, English supercentenarian (b. 1792)
 April 11 – Gemma Galgani, Italian mystic, Catholic saint (b. 1878)
 April 19 – Sir Oliver Mowat, Canadian politician (b. 1820)
 April 28 
 Frances Augusta Conant, American journalist (b. 1841)
 Josiah Willard Gibbs, American physical chemist (b. 1839)
 April 29 – Stuart Robson, American stage actor, comedian (b. 1836)
 May 4 – Gotse Delchev, Macedonian revolutionary (b. 1872)
 May 8 – Paul Gauguin, French painter (b. 1848)
 May 13 – Apolinario Mabini, Filipino political theoretician, Prime Minister of the Philippines (b. 1864)
 June 9 – Gaspar Núñez de Arce, Spanish poet (b. 1834)
 June 11
 Alexander I, King of Serbia (b. 1876)
 Nikolai Bugaev, Russian mathematician (b. 1837)
 Draga Mašin, Serbian queen consort (b. 1861)
 June 14 – Karl Gegenbaur, German anatomist (b. 1826)
 June 15 – Joseph Abbott, Australian wool-broker and politician (b. 1843)
 June 19 – Herbert Vaughan, English Catholic cardinal, archbishop (b. 1832)

July–December

 July 2 – Ed Delahanty, American baseball player, MLB Hall of Famer (b. 1867)
 July 3 – Harriet Lane, Acting First Lady of the United States (b. 1830)
 July 11 – William Ernest Henley, English poet, critic and editor (b. 1849)
 July 13 – Béni Kállay, Austro-Hungarian statesman (b. 1839)
 July 17 – James McNeill Whistler, American painter (b. 1834)
 July 20 – Pope Leo XIII, Italian Roman Catholic Pope (b. 1810)
 August 1 – Calamity Jane, American frontierswoman (b. 1852)
 August 3 – Édouard Pottier, French admiral (b. 1839)
 August 5 – Phil May, English artist (b. 1864)
 August 11 – Eugenio María de Hostos, Puerto Rican philosopher, sociologist (b. 1839)
 August 17 – Hans Gude, Norwegian painter (b. 1825)
 August 22 – Robert Gascoyne-Cecil, 3rd Marquess of Salisbury, Prime Minister of the United Kingdom (b. 1830)
 August 23 – Fray Mocho, Argentine writer (b. 1858)
 August 28 – Frederick Law Olmsted, American landscape architect (b. 1822)
 September 1 – Charles Renouvier, French philosopher (b. 1815)
 September 2 – Julia McNair Wright, American author (b. 1840)
 September 13 – Carl Schuch, Austrian painter (b. 1846)
 September 18 
 Alexander Bain, Scottish philosopher (b. 1818)
 Jules Pellechet, French architect (b. 1829)
 September 19 – Washington Teasdale, English engineer (b. 1830)
 October 4 – Otto Weininger, Austrian-Jewish author (b. 1880)
 October 20 – Thomas Vincent Welch, American politician (b. 1850)
 October 22 – William Edward Hartpole Lecky, Irish historian, member of the House of Commons (b. 1838)
 November 1 – Theodor Mommsen, German writer, Nobel Prize laureate (b. 1817)
 November 11 – Lavilla Esther Allen, American author (b. 1834)
 November 13 – Camille Pissarro, French painter (b. 1830)
 November 25 – Sabino Arana, Spanish Basque writer, nationalist (b. 1865)
 December 8 – Herbert Spencer, English philosopher (b. 1820)
 December 27 – Lydia Hoyt Farmer, American author, women's rights activist (b. 1842)
 December 28 – Margaret Frances Sullivan, Irish-born American author, journalist and editor (b. 1847)
 December 29 – Baba Jaimal Singh, Founder of Radha Soami Satsang Beas (b. 1839)
 December 29 – Jerome Sykes, American actor (b. 1868)

Unknown date
 Mary Elizabeth Beauchamp, American educator and author (b. 1825)

Nobel Prizes

 Physics – Antoine Henri Becquerel, Pierre Curie, and Marie Curie
 Chemistry – Svante August Arrhenius
 Medicine – Niels Ryberg Finsen
 Literature – Bjørnstjerne Bjørnson
 Peace – William Randal Cremer

References

Sources